State Route 110 (SR 110) is a state highway in the southeast part of the U.S. state of Georgia. The highway runs  from a point east of Folkston, northeast to Woodbine, north to Waverly, and northwest to a point east of Hortense.

Route description
The route heads northeast to an intersection with US 17/SR 25 in Woodbine. The three routes begin a concurrency to the north. Just after leaving the city, it crosses the Satilla River. In White Oak, SR 110 intersects SR 252. In Waverly, SR 110 departs the concurrency to the northwest. Just before Atkinson, the route has a very brief concurrency with US 82/SR 520. The route leaves Atkinson to the north and curves to the northwest to its northern terminus, at an intersection with SR 32, east of Hortense.

Note: SR 110 is unsigned for its concurrency with US 17/SR 25.

History

Major intersections

See also

References

External links

110
Transportation in Camden County, Georgia
Transportation in Brantley County, Georgia